Military censorship is a type of censorship that is the process of keeping military intelligence and tactics confidential and away from the enemy. This is used to counter espionage. Military censorship intensifies during wartime.

United States 
Military censorship existed in the United States since the time of the American Civil War. United States military in the 20th century defined military censorship as "all types of censorship conducted by personnel of the Armed Forces of the United States", and distinguished within it armed forces censorship, civil censorship, prisoner of war censorship and field press censorship.

Notable military censors 

 Israeli Military Censor
 Office of Censorship
 Wartime Information Security Program

See also 

 Cartographic censorship
 Information warfare
 Postal censorship
 Prior restraint 
 War correspondent

References

Censorship
Military